Anton Leo Hickmann (23 March 1834 – 18 July 1906) was a geographer and statistician.

Biography
He was born on March 23, 1834 in Terezin, Bohemia and died on July 18, 1906 in Vienna.

Hickmann studied geography in Prague University. After completing his habilitation, he studied languages and economics. After a brief function as secretary of the Chamber of Commerce in Eger, Hickmann became professor at Reichenberg, where he would work for about 30 years. He was one of the first to become a popular statistician.

References 

1906 deaths
1834 births
Austrian statisticians